Clavulinopsis laeticolor is a coral mushroom in the family Clavariaceae. It fruits singly or in loose groups on the ground, often among mosses. A widely distributed species, it is found in Asia, Europe, North America, and New Zealand.

Similar species include Clavulinopsis fusiformis, C. helvola, Alloclavaria purpurea, Calocera cornea, Clavaria fragilis, and Macrotyphula juncea. Some cannot be distinguished without observation of microscopic features.

References

External links

Clavariaceae
Fungi described in 1868
Fungi of Asia
Fungi of Europe
Fungi of New Zealand
Fungi of North America
Taxa named by Miles Joseph Berkeley